The following lists events that happened during 1911 in South Africa.

Incumbents
 Monarch: King George V.
 Governor-General and High Commissioner for Southern Africa: The Viscount Gladstone.
 Prime Minister: Louis Botha.
 Chief Justice: John de Villiers, 1st Baron de Villiers

Events
April
 18 – Lusitania, a Portuguese 5,557 ton passenger liner, strikes Bellows Rock just off Cape Point en route from Mozambique to Lisbon and sinks. Only 8 out of the 774 people on board lose their lives.
 27 – Louis Botha and J.B.M. Hertzog establish the South African Party.

Births
 8 January – Esther Susanna Mentz, soprano and actress.
 Lillian Masediba Ngoyi, "Ma Ngoyi", dressmaker, political activist and trade unionist.

Deaths
 4 February – Piet Cronjé, Boer General. (b. 1836)
 28 May – Ds. S.J. du Toit, pioneer of the Afrikaans language. (b. 1847)
 23 November – Bernard Tancred, South African cricketer. (b. 1865)

Railways

Railway lines opened
 1 March – Transvaal – India Junction to Alberton, .
 13 April – Natal – Umlaas Road to Mid Illovo (Narrow gauge), .
 11 May – Transvaal – Welverdiend to Lichtenburg, .
 31 May – Cape – Eendekuil to Graafwater, .
 2 July – Transvaal – Welgedag to Modderbee, .
 31 July – Transvaal – Ermelo to Piet Retief, .
 15 August – Transvaal – Pietersburg to Bandelierkop, .
 21 August – Cape – Hopefield to Bergrivier (Narrow gauge), .
 4 September – Free State – Sannaspos to Jammerdrif, .

 7 October – Natal – Merrivale to Howick, .
 8 November – Natal – Port Shepstone to Paddock (Narrow gauge), .
 1 December – Cape – Lady Grey to Melk, .
 2 December – Free State – Bethlehem to Reitz, .
 4 December – Transvaal – Coligny to Delareyville, .

Locomotives
Cape
 The Cape Government Railways places two  Mountain steam locomotives in service. In 1912 they will be designated Class 4 on the South African Railways (SAR).

Natal
 The Natal Government Railways places the first two of seven  Pacific narrow gauge tank steam locomotives in service. On the SAR they will become the Class NG4.

Transvaal
Two new Cape gauge locomotive types enter service on the Central South African Railways (CSAR):
 Nine  Mallet articulated compound steam locomotives. In 1912 they will be designated Class MF by the SAR.
 A single experimental  Mallet. In 1912 it will become the sole Class MG on the SAR.

References

South Africa
Years in South Africa
History of South Africa